Jan Monchaux is a French and German Formula One engineer. He is currently the technical director at the Alfa Romeo Formula One team.

Biography

Monchaux graduated in aerodynamics at the national school of aerodynamics in Toulouse he also studied at Imperial College London. He started his career in Formula 1 in 2002 for the Toyota Racing team, where he served as aerodynamics leader until 2009. Between January 2010 and December 2012, Monchaux worked at Ferrari, also as one of the leaders in the aerodynamics department of the Italian team. In early 2013, he went to Audi Sport, where he was responsible for the aerodynamics department and remained there until he announced, in April 2018, his transfer to the Sauber Formula 1 team becoming the new head of aerodynamics at the Swiss team. On 17 July 2019 Alfa Romeo Racing announced that Monchaux would replace Simone Resta as the team's technical director.

References

Living people
Formula One designers
French motorsport people
21st-century French engineers
1978 births
Sauber Motorsport
Alfa Romeo in Formula One
Alfa Romeo people